Louise Fatio Duvoisin (August 18, 1904 – July 26, 1993) was a Swiss-born American writer of children's books. Many were created in collaboration with her husband Roger Duvoisin, a Swiss-born illustrator, and she is known best for their picture book series Happy Lion. The Happy Lion (1954), first in the series, won the inaugural, 1956 Deutscher Jugendliteraturpreis in its German-language translation (Der glückliche Löwe).

Background 

Louise Fatio was born August 18, 1904, in Lausanne, Switzerland, and educated in Geneva. She emigrated to the US in 1925 and became a naturalized citizen in 1938.

Fatio's earliest work in the U.S. Library of Congress catalog is The Christmas forest, a 48-page book illustrated by Duvoisin, with a 1950 copyright date. It was published by Aladdin Paperbacks no earlier than 1967, perhaps earlier in hardcover.  
Her first book published was The Happy Lion in 1954.

She died in 1993 in New Jersey, USA.

References

External links 

 
 
 Louise Fatio in the German National Library (DNB)

1904 births
1993 deaths
American children's writers
Swiss emigrants to the United States
Writers from New York City